Luciano de Abreu is a Brazilian professional football manager. Since 1993 until 1994 he coached the Yemen national football team. Since 2000 until 2002 he again worked as a head coach of Yemen team.

References

Year of birth missing (living people)
Living people
Brazilian football managers
Yemen national football team managers
Place of birth missing (living people)
Brazilian expatriate sportspeople in Yemen
Brazilian expatriate football managers
Expatriate football managers in Yemen